Otis  may refer to:

Arts and entertainment

Characters
 Otis (Superman), in the films Superman and Superman II and related DC Comics media
 Otis Graves, in the TV series Supergirl
 Otis (The Walking Dead), in the Image Comics series
 Otis the Aardvark, on Children's BBC
 Otis Campbell, in the TV series The Andy Griffith Show
 Otis Driftwood, in Rob Zombie's Firefly film series
 Otis Flannegan or Ratcatcher, a DC Comics character
 Otis Johnson (comics), a Marvel Comics character
 Otis Johnson Jr., a Marvel Comics character
 Otis, in The Adventures of Milo and Otis
 Otis, in the 2006 film Barnyard
 Otis, in the 1997 film Good Burger
 Otis Blake, in the 2009 film Crazy Heart
 Otis Milburn, in the TV series Sex Education
 Otis Otis, in Heather Brewer's book series The Chronicles of Vladimir Tod
 Otis Owl, in Jim Henson's Pajanimals

Film and television
 Otis (film), a 2008 American comedy horror film
 "Otis" (The Jeffersons), a television episode
 "Otis" (Prison Break), a television episode

Music
 Otis (Brian McFadden album), 2019
 Otis (Mojo Nixon album), 1990
 "Otis" (song), by Jay-Z and Kanye West, 2011
 "Otis", a song by Magma from Merci, 1985

People
 Otis (given name), a list of people with the given name
 Otis (surname), a list of people with the surname
 Otis (wrestler) (born 1991), American wrestler
 Otis family, an American political family
 Otis, American rapper in the duo Axe Murder Boyz

Places

United States
 Otis, Colorado
 Otis, Indiana
 Otis, Iowa
 Otis, Kansas
 Otis, Louisiana
 Otis, Maine
 Otis, Massachusetts
 Otis, Oregon
 Otis, Wisconsin

Elsewhere
 Otiš, a populated place in Sanski Most (FBiH), Bosnia and Herzegovina
 Nackawic, New Brunswick, Canada, earlier known as Otis

Other uses
 Otis Air National Guard Base, Cape Cod, Massachusetts, US
 Otis College of Art and Design, in Los Angeles, California, US
 Otis Hotel, a historic building in Spokane, Washington, US
 Otis Worldwide, an American manufacturer of elevators, escalators, and related systems

See also
 
 
 Otis tarda, or great bustard, a bird
 Ohtis, an American country rock band